James Crowe may refer to:
    
James Crowe (surgeon), English surgeon and twice Mayor of Norwich
James E. Crowe, American immunologist and virologist
J. D. Crowe, American musician
Jim Crowe (footballer), Australian rules footballer

See also
James Crow (disambiguation)
 Jim Crow (disambiguation)